Rhodeswood Reservoir is a man-made lake in Longdendale in north Derbyshire. It was constructed by John Frederick Bateman between 1849 and June 1855 as part of the Longdendale chain to supply water from the River Etherow to the urban areas of Greater Manchester. It is third in the chain, and it is from here that the water is extracted to pass through the Mottram Tunnel to Godley for Manchester.

The Manchester Corporation Waterworks Act 1847 gave permission for the construction of the Woodhead and Arnfield reservoirs; the Manchester Corporation Waterworks Act 1848 allowed the construction of Torside and Rhodeswood Reservoir, and an aqueduct to convey the water to the Arnfield reservoir where it would pass through the Mottram Tunnel to Godley.

During construction, landslips were a problem. On the night of 6 February 1852,  of land beneath the contractors' village of New Yarmouth moved  obliquely to the watercourse. Bateman consulted the engineers Robert Stephenson and Isambard Kingdom Brunel. Pipes were sunk to draw off the water from the underlying shale.

The purest water in a reservoir lies between 1.5 and 3 metres beneath the water's surface, so water was extracted by means of syphons. The water now flows directly to the Arnfield Treatment Works in Tintwistle and to the Mottram Tunnel.

A statutory report, prepared under the Reservoir Safety Act 1975 and dated 12 June, stated that all five reservoirs could be overtopped during a Probable Maximum Flood. Woodhead as the fountainhead would have the most extensive improvements, and with these completed there was no danger at Rhodeswood of overtopping; however, there was weakness in the north spillway. The work took place between 1994 and 1995.

See also 
 List of dams and reservoirs in United Kingdom

References 

Reservoirs of the Peak District
Drinking water reservoirs in England
Works by John Frederick Bateman
Reservoirs in Derbyshire